Bulbophyllum andersonii is a species of orchid in the genus Bulbophyllum in section Cirrhopetalum.

References
 The Bulbophyllum-Checklist
 The Internet Orchid Species Photo Encyclopedia

andersonii